Printers Row, also known as Printing House Row, is a neighborhood located in the south of the Chicago downtown area known as the Loop. The heart of Printers Row is generally defined by Ida B. Wells Drive on the north, Polk Street on the south, Plymouth Court on the east, and the Chicago River on the west.  This neighborhood overlaps significantly with the officially designated landmark Printing House Row District to the north of Ida B Wells Drive and the South Loop Printing House District to the south of the Drive. The neighborhood includes Dearborn Station, which is also on the National Register of Historic Places.

Many of the buildings in this area were used by printing and publishing businesses. Today, the buildings have mainly been converted into residential lofts with the last remaining printer, Palmer Printing, Inc., near the corner of Clark and Polk streets, selling to residential developers in early 2018.

Buildings
Buildings in the neighborhood include the M.A. Donohue & Co. Building at Plymouth Court and Polk Street, and the red brick and polychromatic tile  Franklin Building. It features painted tile depictions of printing tradesmen such as a bookbinder and typesetter as well as a painted tile mural of the "first impression" of the Gutenberg Bible.

When Ida B. Wells Drive, then known as Congress Parkway, was extended west between 1949 and 1952 through the area, it separated what is now the historic buildings of the Printing House Row District from those of the South Loop Printing House District.

Education
Printers Row is zoned to the following Chicago Public Schools campuses: South Loop School and Phillips Academy High School.  The campus of Jones College Prep High School is also located near Printers Row at 700 S State Street.

The area is also a student-oriented center with the University Center of Chicago (UCC), housing over 3,000 college students in dorm and apartment style units, as well as Dwight Lofts and 731 South Plymouth Court, two student housing buildings owned by Columbia College Chicago. Colleges in the area include Roosevelt University, Columbia College, Robert Morris University, UIC Law School, and the Loop campus of DePaul University.

Transportation
Printers Row is served by the Harrison Station on the CTA's Red Line, as well as LaSalle Station on the Blue Line.

Festivals
The annual Printers Row Literary Festival, "Lit Fest", is held in early June along Dearborn Street.

See also
 Community areas in Chicago
 M.A. Donohue & Co.

Notes

External links

 Printers Row, Chicago at City-Data
 Official City of Chicago Loop Community Map

Central Chicago
Neighborhoods in Chicago